Morris (also Morris Station) is an unincorporated community in southeastern Quitman County, Georgia, United States. Its elevation is 249 feet (76 m).  It has a ZIP code of 39867.  The community lies a short distance to the south of U.S. Route 82, to the southeast of the city of Georgetown, the county seat of Quitman County.

History
The Georgia General Assembly incorporated Morris as a town in 1911. The community most likely was named after James Morris, the son of a railroad agent. The municipal charter of Morris was repealed in 1995.

References

Former municipalities in Georgia (U.S. state)
Unincorporated communities in Quitman County, Georgia
Unincorporated communities in Georgia (U.S. state)
Populated places disestablished in 1995